Darnell Nurse (born February 4, 1995) is a Canadian professional ice hockey defenceman and alternate captain for the Edmonton Oilers of the National Hockey League (NHL). Nurse was selected by the Oilers seventh overall in the 2013 NHL Entry Draft.

Early life 
Nurse was born on February 4, 1995, in Hamilton, Ontario. Both of his parents were athletes in their youth: his father Richard Nurse played as a wide receiver for the Hamilton Tiger-Cats of the Canadian Football League, while his mother Cathy was a college basketball player for the McMaster Marauders. As a child, Nurse played football, basketball, lacrosse, and ice hockey, but by high school, he was only playing the latter. His father was worried that Nurse would suffer an injury playing football, while he was, in his own words, "just no good" at basketball.

Standing  and weighing  by the age of 15, Nurse established himself quickly as a strong, physically assertive defenceman for the Don Mills Flyers minor ice hockey team.

Playing career

Major junior
Nurse was selected third overall by the Sault Ste. Marie Greyhounds in the 2011 Ontario Hockey League (OHL) Priority Selection. After two seasons with the Greyhounds, he was selected seventh overall by the Edmonton Oilers in the 2013 NHL Entry Draft. On July 25, the Oilers signed Nurse to a three-year, entry-level contract. He was returned to the Greyhounds for the 2013–14 season. Prior to the season beginning, he was named team captain. He scored a career-high 50 points in 64 games. After the Greyhounds' season ended, Nurse joined the Oilers' American Hockey League (AHL) affiliate, the Oklahoma City Barons. He skated in four regular season games as well as three playoff games.

Edmonton Oilers
Nurse made the Oilers' opening night roster for the 2014–15 season, but did not partake in the team's first three games. He made his NHL debut on October 14 in a 6–1 loss to the Los Angeles Kings. After skating in two games for the team, the Oilers sent Nurse back to the Greyhounds on October 17.

Nurse began the 2015–16 season with the Oilers' new AHL affiliate, the Bakersfield Condors. After six games with the Condors, the Oilers recalled Nurse on October 26. On October 27, Nurse scored his first career NHL goal in a 4–3 loss to the Minnesota Wild. On March 10, 2016, Nurse was suspended three games for "serving as the aggressor" during an altercation with San Jose Sharks defenceman Roman Polák. He finished his rookie season skating in 69 games for the Oilers and nine for the Condors.

On December 12, 2016, the Oilers announced Nurse underwent successful ankle surgery that would sideline him for up to 12 weeks. After a 35-game absence, he returned on February 26, 2017, in a 5–4 loss to the Nashville Predators.

On September 17, 2018, the Oilers re-signed Nurse to a two-year, $6.4 million contract extension.

On October 1, 2019, Nurse (alongside Leon Draisaitl) was named an alternate captain for the Oilers. On February 10, 2020, the Oilers signed Nurse to a two-year, $11.2 million contract extension.

On August 6, 2021, Nurse signed an eight-year, $74 million extension with the Oilers.

International play

During the 2011–12 season he won a bronze medal with Team Ontario at the 2012 World U-17 Hockey Challenge and was named to the Tournament All-Star Team. That same season, Nurse was one of only four underage players to play with Team Canada at the 2012 IIHF World U18 Championships, winning the bronze medal.

During the 2012–13 season he played with Team Canada to win a gold medal at the 2012 Ivan Hlinka Memorial Tournament. Nurse was also an invited participant at the 2013 CHL Top Prospects Game.

He won gold with Canada at the 2015 World Junior Ice Hockey Championship and was named one of Canada's top three players, as well as the player of the match for the gold medal game against Russia.

On April 12, 2018, Nurse and teammates Connor McDavid and Ryan Nugent-Hopkins were named to the Team Canada's 2018 IIHF World Championship roster.

On April 29, 2019, Nurse returned to the international stage to be named to the Team Canada roster for the 2019 IIHF World Championship held in Slovakia. Nurse helped Canada progress through to the playoff rounds before losing the final to Finland to finish with the Silver Medal on May 26, 2019. He completed the tournament posting 2 goals and 4 points from the blueline in 10 games.

Personal life
Nurse attended St. Thomas More Catholic Secondary School and St. Mary's College, where he was awarded the Bobby Smith Trophy for "OHL Scholastic Player of the Year" following the 2012–13 season.

He is the son of former Canadian Football League wide receiver Richard Nurse. His sister, Kia, currently plays for the Seattle Storm of the Women's National Basketball Association (WNBA). She won two NCAA championship with the Connecticut Huskies, and is a member of the Canadian national team. His cousin, Sarah Nurse, won a gold medal at the 2022 winter Olympics and a silver medal with the Canadian national ice hockey team at the 2018 Winter Olympics. His uncle, Donovan McNabb, was an NFL quarterback who played in six Pro Bowls and had his number retired by the Philadelphia Eagles.

Nurse and his fiancée Mikayla welcomed their first child, a son named Aiden, on Tuesday, May 25, 2021.

Career statistics

Regular season and playoffs

International

Awards and honours

References

External links

1995 births
Living people
Bakersfield Condors players
Black Canadian ice hockey players
Canadian expatriate ice hockey players in the United States
Canadian ice hockey defencemen
Canadian sportspeople of Trinidad and Tobago descent
Edmonton Oilers draft picks
Edmonton Oilers players
Ice hockey people from Ontario
National Hockey League first-round draft picks
Nurse family
Oklahoma City Barons players
Sault Ste. Marie Greyhounds players
Sportspeople from Hamilton, Ontario